Catoctin Creek is the name of two streams in the Mid-Atlantic region of the United States:

Catoctin Creek (Maryland)
Catoctin Creek (Virginia)

Catoctin Creek is also a distillery in Purcellville, Virginia, in the United States:

Catoctin Creek Distilling Company